The following is a list of districts and sub-districts in Bangli Regency. Bangli Regency has 4 district, 4 sub-district, and 68 villages. In 2017, the population estimated 264.945 with area 490,71 km² and density 540 people/km².

List of districts and sub-districts in Bangli Regency as follows:

References

See also 
 List of districts of Indonesia
 List of districts of Bali
 Subdivisions of Indonesia

External links 
  Official Website Statistical Bureau of Bangli Regency
  Official Website Bali Province
  Official Website Bangli Regency

Bangli Regency
Bangli Regency